Chandih is a village in Bahadurpur Block, Darbhanga District, Bihar, India.

Geography
Nearby places are Ekmighat Chowk (0.2 km), Ojhaul (0.5 km), Taralahi (1.5 km), Godhiyari (1.5 km), Mustafapur (2 km), .Laheriasarai (2.5 km). Nearest Towns are Darbhanga (4 km),  Madhubani (50 km), Muzaffarpur (70 km), Samastipur (37 km)

Education
 M.R. Public School
 Primary School (North)
 Primary School (West)

Transport
Nearby Roadways is Ekmi-Sobhan (SH-50 to NH-57) Bypass Road crosses through the village. The nearby State Highway is State Highway 50 (Bihar) (0.2 Km) and nearby National Highway is National Highway 57 (India) (10 km)
The Nearest Railway Station is Laheriasarai Railway Station, which distance is 4.5 Km.

Mosque in Chandih
 Jama Masjid
 Fatima Masjid

Villages in Darbhanga district